Parliamentwatch is an Internet portal that allows German citizens to question their representatives in the German parliament (the Bundestag) publicly. The independent, nonpartisan site aims to increase transparency in government and deepen German democracy. Questions and answers are published, as well as the voting records of the deputies. Users of the site can contact representatives of the Bundestag, German deputies of the European Parliament and of the German federal states.

abgeordnetenwatch.de is a non-profit project of Parlamentwatch e.V. and Parlamentwatch GmbH (technical service provider for Parlamentwatch e.V.) in cooperation with Mehr Demokratie e.V. and Mehr Bürgerrechte e.V. and is supported by BonVenture - Fonds und Stiftung für Soziale Verantwortung. The goal is to be financed through fund-raising groups and online advertisements that can be hidden on demand. Additional income comes from selling enhanced profiles to deputies and candidates. Parlamentwatch GmbH is obliged to donate any excess funds to charitable organizations serving the public good. This commitment is defined in the organization's statutes.

Moderation 
All questions are read by a team of moderators to make sure they are within the moderation code, which prohibits insulting statements, incitement, discrimination, questions concerning private life, and requests that are bound to discretion.

Questions that violate the code are not activated and published, but the politician is informed about the incident.   Beyond that, the project is strongly committed to neutrality and stays above party politics. In addition to general information about deputies, their voting behavior in issues that attract special public attention is documented.

Statistics 
In average, the website counts 6,800 visitors a day and about three million page impressions per month. More than 80% of all MPs of the federal parliament answer questions through Parliament Watch. In Germany, the project covers the federal parliament, the European parliament, nine state parliaments and 54 parliaments on the communal level. All in all the digital voters' memory counts 143,507 questions and 115,921 answers (as of 31 January 2013).

Media partnerships 
The project has several partnerships with online outlets of the following media:
 Der Spiegel
 Süddeutsche Zeitung
 stern
 Die Welt
 Frankfurter Rundschau
 Der Tagesspiegel.

Awards 
 2010 Fairness Initiative Award
 2011 German Prize for Civic Engagement 2011
 2012 Boris Hekele of Parlamentwatch e.V. for www.abgeordnetenwatch.de: Wolfgang-Heilmann-Preis for the topic "More Democracy through IT"
 2013 Democracy Award by the National Democratic Institute in Washington 2013.

Landesparlamente 
Due to abgeordnetenwatch'''s success in the German Bundestag, fundraising groups were established in August 2007 in order to make the site available for Germany's 16 Landesparlamente ("states"). Donations and sustaining members in each state enable the implementation of the project on the state level; each state's portal is activated once 90 days' advance financing is accrued.

 Hamburgische Bürgerschaft 
abgeordnetenwatch.de is based in Hamburg; the project started in December 2004 for the Hamburgische Bürgerschaft ("Hamburg Parliament") after a successful referendum to reform and democratize the electoral system. The online dialog on abgeordnetenwatch.de enabled the citizens to get to know their politicians better and make a more qualified decision in the elections.  After the election, the site made it possible to ask questions of members of Hamburg's Bezirksversammlungen ("Diets of the borough").

After the establishment of the city parliament that was elected in February 2008, the project was temporarily stopped until enough funding was provided. It was no longer possible to administer abgeordnetenwatch.de on a volunteer basis.

 Controversy 
During the 2007 election campaigns in the German states of Rheinland-Pfalz, Baden-Württemberg, Saxony-Anhalt, Mecklenburg-Vorpommern, Berlin, and Bremen, it was also possible to question the candidates.

In Bremen, candidates of the Social Democratic Party (Sozialdemokratische Partei Deutschlands, SPD) and The Left (Die Linke'') launched a boycott against the project because right-wing candidates had not been excluded.
However, the boycott was interrupted by Social Democrat Helga Ziegert, and Joachim Weihrauch from The Left enhanced his Parliamentwatch profile during the election.

Profile enhancements 
The site publishes basic information about each candidate at no cost. For a €179 fee, candidates can add a photo and web link, announce specific dates and events regarding election campaigns, and publish a résumé of their political work and goals. The proceeds from profile enhancements contribute to the project's budget.

Other countries 
So far further Parliament Watch projects can be found in Ireland, Austria, Luxemburg and Tunisia. In addition, Parliament Watch inspires similar projects in other countries, e.g., Malaysia.

Notes and references

External links 
 Official website 
 Official German website 
 Annual report 2013 
 Wikipedia: abgeordnetenwatch.de 

German political websites